Peter Burge (born 3 July 1974, in Townsville) is a former Australian long and triple jumper. He is most famous for winning the long jump competition at the 1998 Commonwealth Games. He retired from athletics in 2003.

Achievements

Personal bests
Outdoor
Long jump: 8.30 m (w. +1.1 m/s) (Melbourne 2000)
Triple jump: 16.19 m (w. +0.2 m/s) (Seoul 1992)

Indoor
Long jump: 8.11 m (Lisbon 2001, Sindelfingen 2001); then Oceanian record

External links

1974 births
Living people
Australian male long jumpers
Athletes (track and field) at the 1998 Commonwealth Games
Athletes (track and field) at the 2000 Summer Olympics
Olympic athletes of Australia
Sportspeople from Townsville
Commonwealth Games medallists in athletics
Commonwealth Games gold medallists for Australia
Medallists at the 1998 Commonwealth Games
20th-century Australian people